The Greenville City Hall, located on Court Street, is Greenville, Kentucky's city hall. The building was constructed in 1940 by the Works Progress Administration. The building, which was also designed by the WPA, is the only Art Deco building in Muhlenberg County. Its design features vertical piers, fluted pilasters, reverse crow-stepped ornamentation around the entrances, and chevron-shaped moldings on the second-floor windows.

The building was added to the National Register of Historic Places on August 26, 1985.

References

External links

City and town halls on the National Register of Historic Places in Kentucky
Art Deco architecture in Kentucky
Government buildings completed in 1940
National Register of Historic Places in Muhlenberg County, Kentucky
City halls in Kentucky
1940 establishments in Kentucky
Works Progress Administration in Kentucky
Greenville, Kentucky